Max Robert Engman (27 September 1945 – 19 March 2020) was a Finnish historian and translator.

Engman was born in Helsinki. Engman, who from 1968–1973 was an official at the Finnish national archives in Helsinki, published in 1983 a much-noticed dissertation about St. Petersburg and Finland. In 1985, he was appointed professor in general history at Åbo Akademi.

Engman's research foremost studied the Finnish–Russian relations and the European empires. He also studied constitutional issues and the administration. His contributions as a subeditor for Historisk Tidskrift för Finland from 1971–1982 and the journal's editor in chief from 1982–2000 are considered as great.

He died in Helsinki in 2020.

Bibliography 
 Mannen i kolboxen, 1979
 S:t Petersburg och Finland, 1983
 Förvaltningen och utvandringen till Ryssland 1809–1917, 1995
 Petersburgska vägar, 1995
 Norden och flyttningarna under nya tiden, 1997
 Lejonet och dubbelörnen, 2000
 Gränsfall: Utväxlingar och gränstrafik på Karelska näset 1918–1920, 2007

References

External links
 Engman, Max. Biografiskt lexikon för Finland. 

1945 births
20th-century Finnish historians
2020 deaths
Swedish-speaking Finns
Academic staff of Åbo Akademi University
21st-century Finnish historians